Anatrichis is a genus of beetles in the family Carabidae, containing the following species:

 Anatrichis australasiae Chaudoir, 1882
 Anatrichis indica Chaudoir, 1882 
 Anatrichis lilliputana (Macleay, 1888)
 Anatrichis longula Bates, 1882 
 Anatrichis minuta Dejean, 1831 
 Anatrichis nigra Jedlicka, 1936 
 Anatrichis oblonga G.Horn, 1891 
 Anatrichis ogawarai Ueno 
 Anatrichis pedinoides Chaudoir, 1882 
 Anatrichis pusilla Sloane, 1910
 Anatrichis sexstriata Sloane, 1900

References

Licininae